The Radio Club Peruano (RCP) (in English, literally Radio Club of Peru) is a national non-profit organization for amateur radio enthusiasts in Peru.  RCP was founded on December 6, 1930, and the first General Meeting of the organization was held in the halls of the Library of the Geographical Society in Lima, Peru in January, 1931.  The RCP operates a QSL bureau for those amateur radio operators in regular contact with amateur radio operators in other countries, and supports amateur radio operating awards and radio contests.  Radio Club Peruano represents the interests of Peruvian amateur radio operators before national and international regulatory authorities.  RCP is the national member society representing Peru in the International Amateur Radio Union.

Club Repeaters 
Radio Club Peruano (RCP) operates four repeaters in the Lima metropolitan area, three within the two meter amateur radio allocation and one in the 70 centimeter amateur radio allocation. One of the three 2 meter repeaters is dual analog and digital use, DMR being the digital encoding used. DMR has dual talk channels.

RENER 
The National Amateur Radio Emergency Network (RENER) is a network made up of ALL Radio amateurs in Peru who have the desire and predisposition to provide support in situations in which help is needed by making emergency communications at the local and national level.

See also 
International Amateur Radio Union

References 

Newspaper article in 'El Comercio' of Lima, Peru about RCP Retrieved 2010-03-13

Peru
Clubs and societies in Peru
Organizations established in 1930
1930 establishments in Peru
Radio in Peru
Organisations based in Lima